Roger Lawrence Ewing (born January 12, 1942) is an American film and television actor. He is perhaps best known for playing Clayton Thaddeus Greenwood in the American western television series Gunsmoke.

Early life 
Ewing was born in Los Angeles, California in 1942.

Career 
Ewing began his career in 1964, appearing in the film Ensign Pulver, playing Jackson. He also guest-starred in television programs including Rawhide, The Farmer's Daughter, Bewitched, The Eleventh Hour and Room 222. In 1965, Ewing guest-starred in the western television series Gunsmoke, first appearing in the episode "Song for Dying".

Ewing's performance in Gunsmoke impressed the producers. They offered him the role of Clayton Thaddeus Greenwood, and he joined the regular cast. His character went by the name Thad Greenwood. Ewing was originally a Gunsmoke fan, whilst attending Los Angeles High School in Los Angeles, California. He watched the show every Saturday night. Ewing played the role of Marshal Matt Dillon's trusty partner, Clayton “Thad” Greenwood, in his senior year of high school. When Ewing joined the cast of Gunsmoke, there were serious disagreements between star James Arness and CBS about Arness' salary and part-ownership of the television series. Ewing's character was created by CBS with a view to replacing Arness should they deem it necessary.

Ewing's first appearance as Greenwood was in the episode "Clayton Thaddeus Greenwood". He portrayed the son of a sheriff from Oklahoma, traveling to Dodge City, to find his father's killers. His final appearance on Gunsmoke was in the episode "The Prodigal". He enjoyed his time appearing in Gunsmoke, After leaving Gunsmoke, Ewing was replaced by Buck Taylor who played as gunsmith-turned-deputy Newly O'Brian. Ewing retired in 1972, last appearing in the film Play It as It Lays.

Personal life 
After retiring, Ewing became a photographer, for which he had a passion. Ewing resided in Morro Bay, California.

Filmography

Film

Television

References

External links 

Rotten Tomatoes profile

1942 births
Living people
People from Los Angeles
Male actors from Los Angeles
American male film actors
American male television actors
20th-century American male actors
American photographers
20th-century American photographers
Western (genre) television actors